Aberdare General Hospital was a health facility on Abernant Road, Aberdare, Rhondda Cynon Taf, Wales. It was managed by the Cwm Taf Morgannwg University Health Board.

History
The facility was opened by Joseph Shaw, chairman of the Powell Duffryn, in July 1917. After a major fire on 27 September 1929, the hospital was rebuilt and reopened by the Duchess of York in April 1933. It joined the National Health Service in 1948 but, after services transferred to the Ysbyty Cwm Cynon, Aberdare General Hospital closed in 2012.

References

Hospitals in Rhondda Cynon Taf
Hospitals established in 1917
1917 establishments in Wales
Hospital buildings completed in 1917
Buildings and structures in Rhondda Cynon Taf
Defunct hospitals in Wales